The Price of Growing Up (生命之旅) is a TVB television series, premiered in 1987. Theme song "The Infinite Journey" (無限旅程) composition and arrangement by Joseph Koo, lyrics by Wong Jim, sung by Kenny Bee, and the sub theme song "Still My Heart Was Thinking About You" (仍然心在想你) composition and arrangement by Joseph Koo, lyrics by Wong Jim, sung by Kenny Bee and Cally Kwong.

Cast
 Alex Man
 Francis Ng
 Carol Cheng
 Kathy Chow
 Stephen Chow
 Kwan Hoi Shan

1987 Hong Kong television series debuts
1987 Hong Kong television series endings
TVB dramas
1980s Hong Kong television series
Cantonese-language television shows